Graves is an unincorporated community in Terrell County, Georgia, United States.

A variant name for the community was "Graves Station". A post office called Graves Station was established in 1888, the name was changed to Graves in 1927, and the post office closed in 1980. The community has the name of one Iverson Graves.

References

Unincorporated communities in Terrell County, Georgia
Unincorporated communities in Georgia (U.S. state)